The Copa del Generalísimo 1955 Final was the 53rd final of the King's Cup. The final was played at Estadio Chamartín in Madrid, on 5 June 1955, being won by Atlético de Bilbao, who beat Sevilla CF 1-0.

Details

References

1955
Copa
Sevilla FC matches
Athletic Bilbao matches